Rubén Guerrero (born 1 November 1954) is a Salvadoran former swimmer. He competed in five events at the 1968 Summer Olympics.

References

1954 births
Living people
Salvadoran male swimmers
Olympic swimmers of El Salvador
Swimmers at the 1968 Summer Olympics
Sportspeople from San Salvador